The Bailianhe Pumped Storage Power Station (Chinese: 白莲河抽水蓄能电站) is a pumped-storage hydroelectric power station located  east of Huanggang in Hubei Province, China. It was constructed between 2004 and 2010 and has a  installed capacity. The power station operates by shifting water between an upper and lower reservoir to generate electricity. For this project, only the upper reservoir had to be created as an existing reservoir, the Bailianhe Reservoir, was used as the lower. During periods of low energy demand, such as at night, water is pumped from Bailianhe Reservoir up to the upper reservoir. When energy demand is high, the water is released back down to the lower reservoir but the pump turbines that pumped the water up now reverse mode and serve  as generators to produce electricity. The process is repeated as necessary and the plant serves as a peaking power plant.

The lower Bailianhe Reservoir was constructed on the Lotus River in the 1960s by an embankment dam as part of an irrigation plan for the region and to supply water for a small run-the-river power plant still in operation.

While generating electricity, the pump-generators produce 967 million kWh annually but consume 1,289 kWh when pumping. Pumping when energy is low in demand and cheap helps cover the excess cost.

References

Energy infrastructure completed in 2009
Hydroelectric power stations in Hubei
Pumped-storage hydroelectric power stations in China
Dams in China
Dams completed in 2009
Concrete-face rock-fill dams